Cartoon Network is a Scandinavian pay television channel broadcasting cartoons in Denmark, Sweden, Norway, Finland, Faroe Islands, Greenland and Iceland. The channel was created in 2000 when it replaced the Pan-European version of Cartoon Network in the region.

History
Cartoon Network was launched in 1993 across Europe, the Middle East and Africa, and was originally twinned with movie channel TNT (later TCM) in a pan-European version. Cartoon Network ran from 6:00am until 8:00pm CET, with TNT taking over from 8:00pm to 6:00am CET. Some programs on the pan-European feed were dubbed into Norwegian, Swedish and Danish, dubbed locally by companies such as SDI Media Denmark and Dubberman Denmark, for the Danish soundtrack. On December 16, 1996, Cartoon Network became a 24/7 channel, as did TNT. However, a version of the channel called TNT & Cartoon Network  continued to appear on some providers in Europe. In 2000, a regional Scandinavian version of Cartoon Network was created, broadcasting in Danish, Swedish and Norwegian.

In mid-May 2006, the channel rebranded to the City era, with the logo, promos, bumpers and idents altered as well. The Boomerang block was removed but most of its program content still continued to be offered on the channel. In mid-May 2009, the branding was changed to the Arrow era as seen on other CN feeds in the EMEA region at the time. In early 2011, the channel rebranded to the Check It 1.0 era, with a new logo, bumpers and idents influenced by the Checkerboard era.

From October 1, 2012 onwards, there are local Swedish commercials on the Swedish subfeed's ad breaks as opposed to the pan-Nordic commercials aired in Denmark, Norway, Finland and Iceland. Since November 1, 2013, Cartoon Network has been broadcasting in widescreen. Although the channel airs 24/7, some distributors only broadcast the channel between 6:00am and 9:00pm, with Turner Classic Movies filling the remainder of the schedule. Distributors that only broadcast the partial version include Viasat, Telia Digital-tv and many smaller analogue cable systems. The channel is not yet available in Finnish in Finland, but some of the programs on the channel are available in Finnish on local Finnish channels such as MTV3, C More Juniori, Sub and Nelonen.

In November 2014, the channel rebranded to Check It 3.0, following various other EMEA feeds doing so.

On April 2, 2016 Cartoon Network Nordic rebranded to the Check It 4.0 graphics package, marking the first major stage towards the rebrand rollout across the EMEA region.

Logos

Programming blocks

Cartoon Network Classics
The now-defunct Cartoon Network Classics block mainly showed Cartoon Cartoons, along with other programming dropped from the main schedule. It aired at 2:00am CET, to 4:00am CET. The block was not advertised, and did not have any special bumpers. It also lacked commercials.

Toonami

Similarly to its American and British counterparts, the Toonami block mainly showcased action-oriented cartoons. However, not much anime was shown, and Toonami Nordic was more focused on non-Japanese action cartoons. Shows that were shown included Samurai Jack, ''Batman of the Future, X-Men: Evolution, The Real Adventures of Jonny Quest, Justice League, Beyblade and Megas XLR.

Boomerang

When it existed, the Boomerang block on CN Nordic would usually air older content, such as Looney Tunes, Merrie Melodies, Tom and Jerry and various Hanna–Barbera cartoons. When it was removed, its content was spread around the schedule, but over the years the shows have either been removed or moved to Boomerang instead.

References

External links
 Nordic Countries Site
 Danish Official Site
 Norwegian Official Site
 Swedish Official Site

Pan-Nordic television channels
Cartoon Network
Turner Broadcasting System Europe
Television stations in Denmark
Television channels in Finland
Television channels in Norway
Television channels in Sweden
Television channels in Iceland
Television channels and stations established in 2000
Turner Broadcasting System Denmark
Turner Broadcasting System Norway
Turner Broadcasting System Sweden
Warner Bros. Discovery EMEA
Television channel articles with incorrect naming style
2000 establishments in Sweden
2000 establishments in Denmark
2000 establishments in Norway